The Order of the Polar Star is a national award in many nations, namely the following:

 Order of the Polar Star (Sweden)
 Order of the Polar Star (Norway)
 Order of the Polar Star (Mongolia)
 Order of the Polar Star (Yakutia)

See also 
 Order of the Red Banner